Thomas Bianchin (born 11 August 1987) is a French rugby union player. His position is Hooker and he formerly played for Section Paloise in the Top 14. He began his career with FC Grenoble in the Pro D2 before moving to Racing Métro 92 in 2011 and then to Montpellier in 2013.

References

External links
 "Montpellier Hérault RC" profile

1987 births
Living people
French rugby union players
Sportspeople from Albertville
FC Grenoble players
Racing 92 players
Montpellier Hérault Rugby players
Rugby union hookers